Pausanias may refer to:
Pausanias of Athens, lover of the poet Agathon and a character in Plato's Symposium
Pausanias the Regent, Spartan general and regent of the 5th century BC
Pausanias of Sicily, physician of the 5th century BC, who was a friend of Empedocles
Pausanias (king of Sparta), King of Sparta from 408 to 395 BC
Pausanias of Macedon, King of Macedon from 399 to 393 BC
Pausanias (pretender), pretender to the throne of Macedon in the 360s BC
Pausanias of Orestis, bodyguard who assassinated Philip II of Macedon in 336 BC
Pausanias (geographer), Greek traveller, geographer, and writer (Description of Greece) of the 2nd century AD
Pausanias of Damascus, Greek historian of the last quarter of the 2nd century BC
Pafsanias Katsotas (1896-1991), Greek general and mayor of Athens

Greek given names